The Tecate Port of Entry is one three ports of entry in the San Diego–Tijuana metropolitan region. The land port is located between Tecate, California in San Diego County's Mountain Empire and Tecate Municipality in Baja California.  It connects California State Route 188 with Paseo Lázaro Cárdenas, a spur of Mexico Federal Highway 2, as well as Federal Highway 3 to the south. It is a minor port in comparison to the larger San Ysidro Port of Entry and Otay Mesa Port of Entry.  This is attributed in part to the fact that reaching the crossing on the US side requires driving on narrow, winding mountain roads.

History
The original port of entry was established sometime prior to 1919 to inspect the traffic traveling from Tecate, BC Mexico in large part to shop at the Thing Brothers store (later the Johnson store) on the US side of the border.  The current historic border inspection station (where pedestrians continue to be inspected) was built in 1933; this building was listed on the U.S. National Register of Historic Places in 1992. In 2005 the port was re-opened as an expansion project was completed. Vehicular traffic is now inspected in a new facility attached to the rear of the historic port.  The expanded port cost US$18 million and had approximately five times as much space as the original 1933 facility.

See also

 List of Mexico–United States border crossings
 List of Canada–United States border crossings

References

External links
Otay Mesa Land Port of Entry Fact Sheet

Ports of Entry in San Diego–Tijuana
National Register of Historic Places in San Diego County, California
Government buildings on the National Register of Historic Places in California